An object is a philosophical term often used in contrast to the term subject. A subject is an observer and an object is a thing observed. For modern philosophers like Descartes, consciousness is a state of cognition that includes the subject—which can never be doubted as only it can be the one who doubts—and some object(s) that may be considered as not having real or full existence or value independent of the subject who observes it. Metaphysical frameworks also differ in whether they consider objects existing independently of their properties and, if so, in what way.

The pragmatist Charles S. Peirce defines the broad notion of an object as anything that we can think or talk about. In a general sense it is any entity: the pyramids, gods, Socrates, Alpha Centauri, the number seven, a disbelief in predestination or the fear of cats. In a strict sense it refers to any definite being.

A related notion is objecthood. Objecthood is the state of being an object. One approach to defining it is in terms of objects' properties and relations. Descriptions of all bodies, minds, and persons must be in terms of their properties and relations. The philosophical question of the nature of objecthood concerns how objects are related to their properties and relations. For example, it seems that the only way to describe an apple is by describing its properties and how it is related to other things. Its properties may include its redness, its size, and its composition, while its relations may include "on the table", "in the room" and "being bigger than other apples".

The notion of an object must address two problems: the change problems and the problems of substances. Two leading theories about objecthood are substance theory, wherein substances (objects) are distinct from their properties, and bundle theory, wherein objects are no more than bundles of their properties.

Etymology
In English the word object is derived from the Latin objectus (p.p. of obicere) with the meaning "to throw, or put before or against", from ob- and jacere, "to throw". As such it is a root for several important words used to derive meaning, such as objectify (to materialize), objective (a future reference), and objectivism (a philosophical doctrine that knowledge is based on objective reality).

Terms and usage
Broadly construed, the word object names a maximally general category, whose members are eligible for being referred to, quantified over and thought of. Terms similar to the broad notion of object include thing, being, entity, item, existent, term, unit, and individual.

In ordinary language, one is inclined to call only a material object "object". In certain contexts, it may be socially inappropriate to apply the word object to animate beings, especially to human beings, while the words entity and being are more acceptable.

Some authors use object in contrast to property; that is to say, an object is an entity that is not a property. Objects differ from properties in that objects cannot be referred to by predicates. Such usage may exclude abstracts objects from counting as objects. Terms similar to such usage of object include substance, individual, and particular. 

The word object can be used in contrast to subject as well. There are two definitions. The first definition holds that an object is an entity that fails to experience and that is not conscious. The second definition holds that an object is an entity experienced. The second definition differs from the first one in that the second definition allows for a subject to be an object at the same time.

Change
An attribute of an object is called a property if it can be experienced (e.g. its color, size, weight, smell, taste, and location). Objects manifest themselves through their properties. These manifestations seem to change in a regular and unified way, suggesting that something underlies the properties. The change problem asks what that underlying thing is. According to substance theory, the answer is a substance, that which stands for the change.

Problem of substance

Because substances are only experienced through their properties a substance itself is never directly experienced. The problem of substance asks on what basis can one conclude the existence of a substance that cannot be seen or scientifically verified. According to David Hume's bundle theory, the answer is none; thus an object is merely its properties.

In the Mūlamadhyamakakārikā Nagarjuna seizes the dichotomy between objects as collections of properties or as separate from those properties to demonstrate that both assertions fall apart under analysis. By uncovering this paradox he then provides a solution (pratītyasamutpāda – "dependent origination") that lies at the very root of Buddhist praxis. Although Pratītyasamutpāda is normally limited to caused objects, Nagarjuna extends his argument to objects in general by differentiating two distinct ideas – dependent designation and dependent origination. He proposes that all objects are dependent upon designation, and therefore any discussion regarding the nature of objects can only be made in light of the context. The validity of objects can only be established within those conventions that assert them.

Facts
Bertrand Russell updated the classical terminology with one more term, the fact; "Everything that there is in the world I call a fact." Facts, objects, are opposed to beliefs, which are "subjective" and may be errors on the part of the subject, the knower who is their source and who is certain of himself and little else. All doubt implies the possibility of error and therefore admits the distinction between subjectivity and objectivity. The knower is limited in ability to tell fact from belief, false from true objects and engages in reality testing, an activity that will result in more or less certainty regarding the reality of the object. According to Russell, "we need a description of the fact which would make a given belief true" where "Truth is a property of beliefs." Knowledge is "true beliefs".

Applications

Value theory
Value theory concerns the value of objects. When it concerns economic value, it generally deals with physical objects. However, when concerning philosophic or ethic value, an object may be both a physical object and an abstract object (e.g. an action).

Physics
Limiting discussions of objecthood to the realm of physical objects may simplify them. However, defining physical objects in terms of fundamental particles (e.g. quarks) leaves open the question of what is the nature of a fundamental particle and thus asks what categories of being can be used to explain physical objects.

Semantics
Symbols represent objects; how they do so, the map–territory relation, is the basic problem of semantics.

See also

 Abstract object theory
 Abstraction
 Category theory
 Continuous predicate
 Concept
 Hypostatic abstraction
 Hypostasis (philosophy and religion)
 Noumenon and phenomenon 
 Objectivity (philosophy)
 Observer (physics)
 Sign relation
 Ship of Theseus
 Object-oriented ontology
 Subject (grammar)
 Subject (philosophy)
 Nonexistent object

References

Sources

External links
 
 
 

 
Concepts in epistemology
Concepts in metaphysics
Dichotomies
Ontology
Physical objects